This article shows all participating team squads at the 2007 Men's NORCECA Volleyball Championship, held from September 16 to September 21, 2007, in the Anaheim Convention Center in Anaheim, United States.

Head Coach: Ludger Niles

Head Coach: Glenn Hoag

Head Coach: Samuels Blackwood

Head Coach: Jacinto Campechano

Head Coach: Jorge Azair

Head Coach: Carlos Cardona

Head Coach: Gideon Dickson

Head Coach: Hugh McCutcheon

References
US Volleyball 

N
S